Wixamtree is an ancient hundred located in Bedfordshire, England.

Wixamtree was one of the hundreds of Bedfordshire, with its council being the primary form of local government in its area from the Anglo-Saxon times to the nineteenth century.

Parishes
The hundred contained the following parishes:

Blunham, Cardington, Cople, Northill, Southill, Old Warden, Willington

See also
 Hundreds of Bedfordshire
 Wixams new town, named after the ancient hundred (though not located in it)

References

External links

Hundreds of Bedfordshire